Events in the year 1762 in Norway.

Incumbents
Monarch: Frederick V

Events
Hadeland Glassverk is established in Jevnaker.

Arts and literature

Births

24 April – Alexander Møller, surgeon (died 1847).
16 November – Henriette Mathiesen, culture personality (died 1825)

Full date unknown
Peder Jacobsen Bøgvald, politician (died 1829)

Deaths
12 November – Hans Friis, priest and poet (born 1716).

Full date unknown
Lars Pinnerud, woodcarver (born 1700).

See also

References